A service review is a review of an organisation's services designed to identify potential service delivery improvements.  A Service Review can be used to improve the organisation's efficiency and effectiveness, and assists in addressing financial sustainability.
Local government is one of the largest providers of services for the community.  Councils have progressively taken on greater responsibilities for delivering services as community expectations have grown and other levels of government have devolved various functions. By systematically reviewing its services, a council can redesign its mix of services, achieve efficiency gains and generate additional income.

Options
 Changing outputs and levels of service
 Sharing services and resources
 Forming strategic relationships or joint ventures
 Rationalising and making better use of assets
 Outsourcing services or activities
 Internal operational changes e.g. processes, work practices & technology
 Adding or modifying user charges

References
 Hutt City Council Core Services Review Resource Document, 1991
 LMCC Resource Booklet on Review Processes, Professor Brian Dollery, University of New England, 2008
 Process Change versus Structural Change - An Analysis of Internal Review Process, Professor Brian Dollery, University of New England, 2010

Organizational performance management
Outsourcing